The Fiat RS.14 was an Italian long-range maritime strategic reconnaissance floatplane. The RS.14 was a four/five seat all-metal cantilever low/mid-wing monoplane powered by two wing-mounted 626 kW (840 hp) Fiat A.74 R.C.38 engines. It had a conventional cantilever tail unit with a single fin and rudder. Its undercarriage consisted of two large floats on struts. It had a glazed nose for an observer or bomb aimer. The pilot and copilot sat side by side with a wireless operator's compartment behind them. In the bombing role the RS.14 was fitted with a long ventral gondola to carry various combinations of anti-submarine bombs (up to ).

Development
The RS.14 was designed by Manlio Stiavelli at the CMASA works at Marina di Pisa. The first of two prototypes flew in May 1939.

A prototype landplane version AS.14 was built and first flown on 11 August 1943. It was designed as a ground-attack aircraft and intended to be armed with a  cannon and  machine guns. It was not ordered and no others were built.

Operational history
The RS.14 went into service with the Italian Air Force with a number of maritime strategic reconnaissance squadrons at bases around the Italian coast and also in Sicily and Sardinia. They were used for convoy escort duties and anti-submarine patrols. Occasionally they engaged in aerial combat, obtaining unexpected victories such as when, on Saturday 9 May 1942, an RS.14 intercepted Spitfires that took off from the carriers HMS Eagle and USS Wasp, headed for Malta, and machine-gunned two. The two RAF fighters collided and fell into the sea. Both pilots were killed. After the 1943 Armistice a few survivors were operated by the Italian Co-Belligerent Air Force. At the end of the Second World War the aircraft were used for liaison duties around the Mediterranean carrying up to four passengers.

Variants
RS.14
Production float plane with 626 kW (840 hp) Fiat A.74 R.C.38 engines, 188 built including two prototypes.
AS.14
Land plane version with retractable landing gear, one built.

Operators

 Regia Aeronautica
 Italian Co-Belligerent Air Force

 Italian Air Force operated six surviving Fiat RS.14 until 1948

Specifications

See also

Notes

References

 
 Monday, David (1984), The Concise Guide to Axis Aircraft of World War II, Chancellor Press, 
 Rogers, Anthony, Battle over Malta - Aircraft Losses & Crash Sites 194042. Phoenix Mill Thrupp - Stroud, Gloucestershire, Sutton Publishing, 2000. .
 The Illustrated Encyclopedia of Aircraft (Part Work 1982-1985), 1985, Orbis Publishing, Page 1812

RS.14
1940s Italian patrol aircraft
Floatplanes
Aircraft first flown in 1939
Mid-wing aircraft
Twin piston-engined tractor aircraft